Deering ( or Ipnasiaq) is a city in the Northwest Arctic Borough in the U.S. state of Alaska.

As of the 2020 census, the population was 182, up from 136 in 2000. , the city includes a community hall, a clinic run by the U.S. Public Health Service, a post office, a church, two stores, and a National Guard armory.

Culture
The inhabitants are primarily Iñupiat. The people are active in subsistence. The sale or importation of alcohol is banned in the city.

History
The city was established in 1901 as a supply station for interior gold mining called "Yutica" near the historic Malemiut Eskimo village of Inmachukmiut. The name probably comes from the schooner Abbie M. Deering, which was present in the area at that time; see #The Abbie M. Deering. Deering incorporated as a second-class city in 1970. It also has a city council, organized under the Indian Reorganization Act of 1934.

Geography
Deering is located at  (66.075713, -162.718229).

Climate

Demographics

Deering first appeared on the 1910 U.S. Census as an unincorporated city. It incorporated in 1970.

As of the census of 2000, there were 136 people, 42 households, and 28 families residing in the city. There were 61 housing units at an average density of 11.9 per square mile (4.6/km2). The racial makeup of the city was 93.38% Native American (Iñupiat), 5.88% White, and 0.74% from two or more races.

There were 42 households, out of which 40.5% had children under the age of 18 living with them, 21.4% were married couples living together, 33.3% had a female householder with no husband present, and 31.0% were non-families. 23.8% of all households were made up of individuals, and 2.4% had someone living alone who was 65 years of age or older. The average household size was 3.24 and the average family size was 3.90.

In the city the age distribution of the population shows 39.7% under the age of 18, 6.6% from 18 to 24, 28.7% from 25 to 44, 17.6% from 45 to 64, and 7.4% who were 65 years of age or older. The median age was 27 years. For every 100 females, there were 109.2 males. For every 100 females age 18 and over, there were 115.8 males.

The median income for a household in the city was $33,333, and the median income for a family was $43,438. Males had a median income of $26,875 versus $25,625 for females. The per capita income for the village was $11,000. None of the families but 5.8% of the population were below the poverty line. No one under the age of 18 or over 64 were living below the poverty line.

The Abbie M. Deering
A first-hand account written by Captain James D. Winchester and published in 1900 tells that the Abbie M. Deering was bought by a company of twenty men who wanted to sail to the "Alaskan Gold Fields" during the Klondike Gold Rush. They left Lynn, Massachusetts in November 1897, passed through the Straits of Magellan, and arrived at San Francisco five months later, where they sold the ship. Records kept by the Minerals Management Service of the U.S. Department of the Interior show the schooner did make it to Alaska, where it was lost in the Aleutian Islands in September 1903.

Rudyard Kipling's 1897 novel Captains Courageous mentions the Abbie M. Deering by name.

Education
The Deering School, operated by the Northwest Arctic Borough School District, serves the community.  it had 4 teachers and 50 students, with Alaska Natives making up 100% of the student body.

References

External links
 Maniilaq Association web page for Deering

Chukchi Sea
Cities in Alaska
Cities in Northwest Arctic Borough, Alaska
Mining communities in Alaska
Populated coastal places in Alaska on the Arctic Ocean
Populated places in the Seward Peninsula